Phoebe Power  (1993) is a British poet, whose work,  Shrines of Upper Austria, won the Forward Poetry Prize for Best First Collection.

Biography
Phoebe Power was born in Newcastle-upon-Tyne in 1993. She was named a Foyle Young Poet of the Year in 2009. She later studied at the University of Cambridge where she led the Pembroke Poetry Society. Power was a recipient of the Eric Gregory Award from the Society of Authors in 2012.

Power's full length poetry collection, Shrines of Upper Austria was published by  Carcanet Press in 2018. She was awarded the Forward Poetry Prize for Best First Collection for the work. The book was named one of four Poetry Book Society Spring Recommendations for  2018  and has been shortlisted for the 2018 T. S. Eliot Prize. The collection was inspired by the life of Power's Austrian grandmother, who married a British soldier and emigrated to England after World War II.

Power lives in York.

Work
—(2021), with Katrina Porteous, Sea Change (Guillemot Press), ISBN 978-1-913749-12-5
—(2017), Shrines of Upper Austria, (Carcanet),  
—(2016), Harp Duet, (Eyewear), pamphlet

Awards
—(2019), Somerset Maugham Award, Shrines of Upper Austria
—(2018), Forward Poetry Prize for Best First Collection, Shrines of Upper Austria
—(2014), Northern Writer Awards  
—(2012),  Eric Gregory Award

References

1993 births
English women poets
Living people
21st-century English poets
Writers from Newcastle upon Tyne
21st-century English women writers
Alumni of the University of Cambridge
English people of Austrian descent